George Elliott "Guy" Clarkson (1 January 1891 – 9 October 1974) was a British ice hockey player who competed in the 1924 Winter Olympics. He was born in York County, Ontario and died in London. In 1924 he was a member of the British ice hockey team, which won the bronze medal.

References

External links
profile

1891 births
1974 deaths
Canadian ice hockey players
Canadian people of British descent
Ice hockey people from Ontario
Ice hockey players at the 1924 Winter Olympics
Olympic bronze medallists for Great Britain
Olympic ice hockey players of Great Britain
People from the Regional Municipality of York
Olympic medalists in ice hockey
Medalists at the 1924 Winter Olympics